Neon Lights is a covers studio album and twelfth studio album by Scottish rock band Simple Minds, released in October 2001.

Overview 
Neon Lights is a collection of cover versions put together as a warm up for what would be the next album Cry (2002). As Jim Kerr stated at the time of the album release: «"Neon Lights is the first time Simple Minds have put together a collection of non-original material. We thought it was appropriate at a period of looking back that we go to the very foundations of Simple Minds, which of course is the music and the bands who influenced us."»

Background
After the band's previous album, Our Secrets Are the Same, was leaked by a DJ in Spain, and Simple Minds were fired from EMI, they went into partial retirement. Frontman Jim Kerr moved to Italy to start a hotel. There a number of young Italian artists came to him for advice or input in recording. This finally coaxed the band out of retirement.

They signed a limited contract with Eagle Records. To help the band gain momentum, it was decided that they should record an album of covers to boost awareness of Simple Minds again. Thus Neon Lights was conceived.

Track listing

Other releases
A promo version was also pressed which was titled Original Versions of Songs Covered on "Neon Lights", which comprised all the original versions of the songs covered, making this the only Simple Minds release to be devoid of Simple Minds music. However, Eagle Records encountered some problems with copyrights for a couple of songs, so fewer than 25 of these promos were pressed, making this extremely hard to find.

Two singles were released from the album: the Dancing Barefoot EP, and a number of remixes of "Homosapien".

Personnel
Simple Minds
 Jim Kerr – vocals, producer (except "Gloria")
 Charlie Burchill – guitar, keyboards, bass, programmed rhythms, arrangements, producer (except "Gloria") 
 Gordy Goudie – guitar, keyboards, bass, drums, vocals, programmed rhythms, arrangements, producer (except "Gloria")
with:
 Dee Miller – additional vocals
 Kevin Burleigh – additional vocals, engineer, mixing
Technical
 Phunk Investigation – producer on "Gloria"
 Daniele Tignino – producer on "Gloria"
 Emiliano Patrik Legato – producer on "Gloria"   
 Simon Heyworth – mastering 
 Fabrique – design 
 Martin Hunter – photography

References

External links

2001 albums
Covers albums
Simple Minds albums